Doug Scamman is a Republican former Speaker of the New Hampshire House of Representatives from Stratham, New Hampshire.

Scamman attended the University of New Hampshire with the help of scholarships and graduated with a degree in political science in 1964. He eventually ran for office and became a state representative and then Speaker of the House in the New Hampshire Legislature. Scamman and his wife, Stella, served as New Hampshire state campaign co-chairs for John Kasich's 2016 presidential campaign. He encouraged Kasich to run again in 2020.

See also
 Scamman Farm

References

20th-century American politicians
21st-century American politicians
Living people
Republican Party members of the New Hampshire House of Representatives
Speakers of the New Hampshire House of Representatives
Year of birth missing (living people)